Follo may refer to:

People
 Francesco Follo (born 1946), Italian priest
 Raymond Isaac Follo, Congolese politician

Places
 Follo, Liguria, Italy
 Follo, Norway

Other
 Follo (newspaper), Norwegian newspaper
 Follo Arbeiderblad, Norwegian newspaper
 Follo FK, Norwegian football club